is a former Japanese football player.

Playing career
Hirayama was born in Fukui Prefecture on June 3, 1972. After graduating from Chuo University, he joined Nagoya Grampus Eight in 1995. He played many matches as center back in his first season. However he did not play in any matches in 1996. In 1997, he moved to the Japan Football League club Kawasaki Frontale. He retired at the end of the 1998 season.

Club statistics

References

External links

1972 births
Living people
Association football people from Fukui Prefecture
Japanese footballers
J1 League players
Japan Football League (1992–1998) players
Nagoya Grampus players
Kawasaki Frontale players
Association football defenders